Halas or Hałas is a surname. Notable people include:

 Ádám Halás (born 1998), Slovak swimmer
 Elżbieta Hałas (born 1954), Polish sociologist
 František Halas (1901–1949), Czech poet
 George Halas (1895–1983), American football player and executive
 George Halas, Jr. (1925–1979), American football executive
 John Halas (1912–1995), British animator
 Naomi Halas, American engineer
 Shane Halas (born 1961), Australian rules footballer
 Teresa Hałas (born 1953), Polish politician
 Virginia Halas McCaskey (born 1923), American football executive
 Walter Halas (1892–1959), American baseball player and coach

See also
 

Czech-language surnames
Polish-language surnames